Anwarul Islam politician of Patuakhali District of Bangladesh, Physician and former member of Parliament for Patuakhali-4 constituency in 1991 and June 1996.

Early life 
Anwarul Islam was born in Patuakhali district. His son, Abdullah Al Mahmoud Liton, is the former organizing secretary of the United States branch of the Awami League and co-secretary of the central subcommittee.

Career 
Anwarul was elected as a Member of Parliament from Patuakhali-4 constituency as a candidate of Bangladesh Awami League in the fifth parliamentary elections of 1991 and the seventh parliamentary elections of 12 June 1996. He was defeated as an independent candidate from Patuakhali-4 constituency in the 8th parliamentary elections of 2001.

References 

Awami League politicians
5th Jatiya Sangsad members
7th Jatiya Sangsad members
Living people
Year of birth missing (living people)
People from Patuakhali district